The Island City was a schooner that sank in Lake Michigan off the coasts of Mequon, Wisconsin and Port Washington, Wisconsin, United States. On November 10, 2011, the shipwreck site was added to the National Register of Historic Places.

History
The Island City was built by Peter Perry in Sans Souci, Michigan in 1859. For most of her service, the vessel carried produce and other merchandise to and from Detroit, Michigan and various other ports on Lake Saint Clair. She later hauled lumber across other portions of Lake Michigan and sank in a storm while en route from Ludington, Michigan to Milwaukee, Wisconsin.

References

 
1859 ships
Shipwrecks of Lake Michigan
Shipwrecks on the National Register of Historic Places in Wisconsin
National Register of Historic Places in Ozaukee County, Wisconsin
Ships built in Michigan
Wreck diving sites